Big Hero 6 is a 2014 American computer-animated superhero film produced by Walt Disney Animation Studios and released by Walt Disney Pictures. Loosely based on the Marvel comics of the same name  created by Man of Action, it is the 54th Disney animated feature film. The film was directed by Don Hall and Chris Williams and produced by Roy Conli, from a screenplay written by Jordan Roberts and the writing team of Robert L. Baird and Dan Gerson. The film stars the voices of Ryan Potter, Scott Adsit, Daniel Henney, T.J. Miller, Jamie Chung, Damon Wayans Jr., Genesis Rodriguez, James Cromwell, Maya Rudolph, and Alan Tudyk. Big Hero 6 tells the story of Hiro Hamada, a young robotics prodigy, and Baymax, his late-brother Tadashi's healthcare-provider robot, who form a superhero team to combat a masked villain who is responsible for Tadashi's death.

Big Hero 6 is the first Disney animated film to feature Marvel Comics characters, whose parent company was acquired by The Walt Disney Company in 2009. Walt Disney Animation Studios created new software technology to produce the film's animated visuals.

Big Hero 6 premiered at the 27th Tokyo International Film Festival on October 23, 2014, and at the Abu Dhabi Film Festival on October 31; it then premiered at the El Capitan Theatre in Los Angeles on November 4, and was theatrically released in the Disney Digital 3D and RealD 3D formats in the United States on November 7. The film was met with both critical and commercial success. It received positive reviews from critics, with praise for the animation, action sequences, pacing, entertainment value, heart, and emotional weight. It grossed over $657.8 million worldwide and became the highest-grossing animated film of 2014. It won the Academy Award for Best Animated Feature and the Kids' Choice Award for Favorite Animated Movie. It also received nominations for the Annie Award for Best Animated Feature and the Golden Globe Award for Best Animated Feature Film, losing both to How to Train Your Dragon 2. It was also nominated for the BAFTA Award for Best Animated Film, but lost to The Lego Movie. Big Hero 6 was released on DVD and Blu-ray Disc on February 24, 2015.

A television series, which continues the story of the film, aired from 2017 to 2021 on Disney Channel and Disney XD.  A two-season short series, Baymax Dreams, premiered in 2018. Another series, Baymax!, premiered on Disney+ on June 29, 2022.

Plot
In the futuristic city of San Fransokyo (a portmanteau of San Francisco and Tokyo), Hiro Hamada, a 14-year-old high school graduate and robotics prodigy, is competing in underground robot fights for a living, constantly dodging violent threats from his bitter, defeated opponents. In an effort to get Hiro out of this dangerous lifestyle, Hiro's older brother Tadashi takes him to his research lab at the San Fransokyo Institute of Technology. Hiro meets Tadashi's friends Go Go, Wasabi, Honey Lemon, and Fred, as well as his creation Baymax — an inflatable healthcare robot — and his mentor, Professor Robert Callaghan. Inspired, Hiro gives up his robot fighting habits and applies to the university, impressing the school's showcase with his project: a swarm of tiny microbots that can link together in any configuration using a neural transmitter. Callaghan accepts him into the school, and Hiro rejects tech giant Alistair Krei's offer to buy the microbots. When a fire erupts moments later, Tadashi rushes inside to save Callaghan, but dies when the building collapses after an explosion resulting from the fire.

Two weeks later, Hiro inadvertently activates Baymax and they follow his only remaining microbot to an abandoned warehouse, where they discover someone has been mass-producing the microbots. A man wearing a Kabuki mask attacks them with the microbot swarm, but they escape, and Hiro suspects the masked man set the fire to cover his theft of the microbots. Determined to avenge his brother's death, Hiro equips Baymax with armor and a chip programmed with martial arts moves for defense, and they return to find the warehouse empty. At the nearby docks, Baymax summons Tadashi's friends, and the group is attacked by the masked man but escapes after driving into a lake. Once they resurface, the group stops at Fred's mansion, where Hiro upgrades Baymax's armor and he and the others weaponize their various inventions to take on the masked man, whom they suspect is Krei.

They track the masked man to Krei's abandoned island lab, which they discover was used for teleportation research until a test pilot disappeared inside a portal, leading the government to shut down Krei's experiment and seal off the island.  The masked man suddenly attacks the group, but Hiro knocks off the man's mask, revealing him to be Callaghan, who was thought to be dead. Callaghan reveals that he had actually escaped using the microbots to shield himself from the flames. Shocked and enraged that Tadashi died in vain, Hiro removes Baymax's healthcare chip and orders him to kill Callaghan, but his friends intervene and Honey re-installs the chip at the last second. Callaghan escapes with the microbots, and Hiro, angered by his friends’ actions against Callaghan, flies off with Baymax, still intent on avenging Tadashi.

When they return home, Hiro tries to remove the healthcare chip again, but Baymax blocks his access port and shows him footage of Tadashi's numerous tests during Baymax's development, reminding Hiro that his brother's goal was to help others. Hiro apologizes to Baymax and his friends; through research, they discover the lost test pilot was Callaghan's daughter, Abigail.

Having stolen the microbots to seek revenge on Krei, Callaghan reactivates the teleportation portal to destroy Krei and his headquarters during a ceremony, but Hiro, Baymax, and their friends defeat Callaghan and save Krei. Baymax detects Abigail alive inside the portal, and despite Krei’s attempts to keep them away from the portal because of its instability, Hiro and Baymax leap through and find Abigail trapped in hyper-sleep in her rocket. While helping Hiro transport Abigail out of the portal, Baymax is struck by debris, disabling his thrusters and forcing him to fire his rocket fist, leaving him behind while propelling Hiro and Abigail back through the portal before it is destroyed. Abigail regains consciousness, and Callaghan is arrested.

Hiro joins his friends at the university, and discovers Baymax's healthcare chip clenched in the rocket fist. He rebuilds Baymax, and they and their friends continue to protect the city as a team of high-tech superheroes, known as Big Hero 6.

In a post-credits scene, Fred stumbles upon a secret superhero lair in his family mansion and is reunited with his father, who tells him they have a lot to talk about.

Voice cast

Scott Adsit as Baymax, an inflatable robot built by Tadashi as a medical assistant. Hall said, "Baymax views the world from one perspective – he just wants to help people, he sees Hiro as his patient". Producer Roy Conli said "The fact that his character is a robot limits how you can emote, but Scott was hilarious. He took those boundaries and was able to shape the language in a way that makes you feel Baymax's emotion and sense of humor. Scott was able to relay just how much Baymax cares".
Ryan Potter as Hiro Hamada, a 14-year-old robotics prodigy. Speaking of the character, co-director Don Hall said "Hiro is transitioning from boy to man, it's a tough time for a kid and some teenagers develop that inevitable snarkiness and jaded attitude. Luckily Ryan is a very likeable kid. So no matter what he did, he was able to take the edge off the character in a way that made him authentic, but appealing".
Daniel Henney as Tadashi Hamada, Hiro's older brother and Baymax's creator. On Tadashi and Hiro's relationship, Conli said "We really wanted them to be brothers first. Tadashi is a smart mentor. He very subtly introduces Hiro to his friends and what they do at San Fransokyo Tech. Once Hiro sees Wasabi, Honey, Go Go, and Fred in action, he realizes that there's a much bigger world out there that really interests him".
T.J. Miller as Fred, a comic-book fan and slacker who is also a team mascot at San Fransokyo Institute of Technology. Speaking of Miller, co-director Chris Williams said "He's a real student of comedy. There are a lot of layers to his performance, so Fred ended up becoming a richer character than anyone expected", both literally and metaphorically.
Jamie Chung as Go Go, a tough, athletic student who specializes in electromagnetics. Hall said "She's definitely a woman of few words. We looked at bicycle messengers as inspiration for her character".
Damon Wayans Jr. as Wasabi, a smart, slightly neurotic youth who specializes in lasers. On the character, Williams said "He's actually the most conservative, cautious—he  the most normal among a group of brazen characters. So he really grounds the movie in the second act and becomes, in a way, the voice of the audience and points out that what they're doing is crazy".
Genesis Rodriguez as Honey Lemon, a chemistry enthusiast at San Fransokyo Institute of Technology. Williams said "She's a glass-is-half-full kind of person. But she has this mad-scientist quality with a twinkle in her eye – there's more to Honey than it seems".
Rodriguez reprised her role in the Latin American Spanish dubbing of the movie.
James Cromwell as Robert Callaghan / "Yokai", the head of a robotics program at San Fransokyo Institute of Technology who becomes an extremely powerful masked supervillain, who plots revenge against Krei.
Alan Tudyk as Alistair Krei, a pioneer entrepreneur, tech guru, and the CEO of Krei Tech and is always on the hunt for the next big thing.
Maya Rudolph as Cass, Hiro and Tadashi's aunt and guardian.
Katie Lowes as Abigail Callaghan, the daughter of Professor Callaghan and a test pilot for Krei Tech.
Daniel Gerson as Desk Sergeant Gerson, the desk sergeant for the San Fransokyo Police Department.
Paul Briggs as Yama, a notorious gangster who seeks revenge after Hiro defeats his robot in a clandestine robot fight with illegal betting.
David Shaughnessy as Heathcliff, Fred's family butler.
Billy Bush as Newscaster
Stan Lee as Fred's dad, who appears during the tour of Fred's house in a family portrait and briefly appears at the end of the credits.

Production

After Disney's acquisition of Marvel Entertainment in 2009, CEO Bob Iger encouraged the company's divisions to explore Marvel's properties for adaptation concepts. By deliberately picking an obscure title, it would give them the freedom to come up with their own version. While directing Winnie the Pooh, director Don Hall was scrolling through a Marvel database when he stumbled upon Big Hero 6, a comic he had never heard of before. "I just liked the title," he said. He pitched the concept to John Lasseter in 2011, as one of five ideas for possible productions for Walt Disney Animation Studios, and this particular idea "struck a chord" with Lasseter, Hall, and Chris Williams (Director of Bolt).

In June 2012, Disney confirmed that Walt Disney Animation Studios was adapting Marvel Comics' series and that the film had been commissioned into early stages of development. Because they wanted the concept to feel new and fresh, head of story Paul Briggs (who also voices Yama in the film) only read a few issues of the comic, while screenwriter Robert Baird admitted he had not read the comic at all.

Big Hero 6 was produced solely by Walt Disney Animation Studios, although several members of Marvel's creative team were involved in the film's production including Joe Quesada, Marvel's chief creative officer, and Jeph Loeb, head of Marvel Television. According to an interview with Axel Alonso by CBR, Marvel did not have any plans to publish a tie-in comic. Disney planned to reprint the Marvel version of Big Hero 6 themselves, but reportedly Marvel disagreed. They eventually came to agreement that Yen Press would publish the Japanese manga version of Big Hero 6 for Disney.

Conversely, Lasseter dismissed the idea of a rift between the two companies, and producer Roy Conli stated that Marvel allowed Disney "complete freedom in structuring the story". Disney Animation Studio President Andrew Millstein stated: "Hero is one example of what we've learned over the years and our embracing some of the Pixar DNA." Regarding the film's story, Quesada stated, "The relationship between Hiro and his robot has a very Disney flavor to it ... but it's combined with these Marvel heroic arcs." The production team decided early on not to connect the film to the Marvel Cinematic Universe and instead set the film in a stand-alone universe.

With respect to the design of Baymax, Hall mentioned in an interview, "I wanted a robot that we had never seen before and something to be wholly original. That's a tough thing to do, we've got a lot of robots in pop culture, everything from The Terminator to WALL-E to C-3PO on down the line and not to mention Japanese robots, I won't go into that. So I wanted to do something original." Even if they did not yet know what the robot should look like, artist Lisa Keene came up with the idea that it should be a huggable robot. Other sources of inspiration cited by the team include Japanese anime, such as Hayao Miyazaki films (including Spirited Away and The Wind Rises) and Pokémon, as well as Shogun Warriors toys. Mecha designer Shigeto Koyama, who previously did design work for mecha anime such as Gunbuster 2, Eureka Seven, Gurren Lagann, and Rebuild of Evangelion, worked on the concept design for Baymax.

Early on in the development process, Hall and the design team took a research trip to Carnegie Mellon University's Robotics Institute, where they met a team of DARPA-funded researchers who were pioneering the new field of 'soft robotics' using inflatable vinyl, which ultimately inspired Baymax's inflatable, vinyl, truly huggable design. Hall stated that "I met a researcher (Chris Atkeson) who was working on soft robots. ... It was an inflatable vinyl arm and the practical app would be in the healthcare industry as a nurse or doctor's assistant. He had me at vinyl. This particular researcher went into this long pitch but the minute he showed me that inflatable arm, I knew we had our huggable robot." Hall stated that the technology "will have potential probably in the medical industry in the future, making robots that are very pliable and gentle and not going to hurt people when they pick them up."

Hall mentioned that achieving a unique look for the mechanical armor took some time and "just trying to get something that felt like the personality of the character". Co-director Williams stated, "A big part of the design challenge is when he puts on the armor you want to feel that he's a very powerful intimidating presence ... at the same time, design-wise he has to relate to the really adorable simple vinyl robot underneath." Baymax's face design was inspired by a copper suzu bell that Hall noticed while at a Shinto shrine.

According to Conli, Lasseter initially disliked Baymax's description (while low on battery power) of Hiro's cat as a "hairy baby", but Williams kept the line in any way, and at the film's first test screening, Lasseter admitted that Williams was correct.

According to Williams, Baymax was originally going to be introduced rather late in the film, but then story artist John Ripa conceived of a way for Baymax to meet Hiro much earlier. The entire film became much stronger by establishing the relationship between Hiro and Baymax early on, but the filmmakers ended up having to reconstruct "a fair amount of the first act" in order to make that idea work.

About ninety animators worked on the film at one point or another; some worked on the project for as long as two years. In terms of the film's animation style and settings, the film combines Eastern world culture (predominantly Japanese) with Western world culture (predominantly California). In May 2013, Disney released concept art and rendered footage of San Fransokyo from the film. San Fransokyo, the futuristic mashup of San Francisco and Tokyo, was described by Hall as "an alternate version of San Francisco. Most of the technology is advanced, but much of it feels retro … Where Hiro lives, it feels like the Haight. I love the Painted ladies. We gave them a Japanese makeover; we put a cafe on the bottom of one. They live above a coffee shop." The house that Hiro's family lives in is based on a Victorian house at the corner of Haight Street and Masonic Avenue in the Haight-Ashbury. According to production designer Paul Felix, "The topography is exaggerated because what we do is caricature, I think the hills are  times exaggerated. I don't think you could really walk up them ... When you get to the downtown area, that's when you get the most Tokyo-fied, that pure, layered, dense kind of feeling of the commercial district there. When you get out of there, it becomes more San Francisco with the Japanese aesthetic. … (It's a bit like) Blade Runner, but contained to a few square blocks. You see the skyscrapers contrasted with the hills."

The reason why Disney wanted to merge Tokyo (which is where the comic book version takes place) with San Francisco was partly because San Francisco had not been used by Marvel before, partly because of all the city's iconic aspects, and partly because they felt its aesthetics would blend well with Tokyo. The filmmakers' idea was that San Fransokyo is based on an alternative history in which San Francisco was largely rebuilt by Japanese immigrants in the aftermath of the 1906 earthquake, although this premise is not stated in the film.

To create San Fransokyo as a detailed digital simulation of an entire city, Disney purchased the actual assessor data for the entire city and county of San Francisco. The final city contains over 83,000 buildings and 100,000 vehicles.

A software program called Denizen was used to create over 700 distinctive characters that populate the city. Another one named Bonzai was responsible for the creation of the city's 250,000 trees, while a new rendering system called Hyperion offered new illumination possibilities, like light shining through a translucent object (e.g. Baymax's vinyl covering). Pixar's RenderMan was considered as a "Plan B" for the film's rendering, if Hyperion was not able to meet production deadlines.

Development on Hyperion started in 2011 and was based upon research into multi-bounce complex global illumination originally conducted at Disney Research in Zürich. Disney, in turn, had to assemble a new super-computing cluster just to handle Hyperion's immense processing demands, which consists of over 2,300 Linux workstations distributed across four data centers (three in Los Angeles and one in San Francisco). Each workstation, included a pair of 2.4 GHz Intel Xeon processors, 256 GB of memory, and a pair of 300 GB solid-state drives configured as a RAID Level 0 array (i.e., to operate as a single 600 GB drive). This was all backed by a central storage system with a capacity of five petabytes, which holds all digital assets as well as archival copies of all 54 Disney Animation films. Cinematographer Robert Richardson was brought on as a visual consultant to assist in the creation of realistic lighting.

The emotional climax takes place in the middle of a wormhole portal, which is represented by the stylized interior of a mandelbulb.

The post-credits scene was only added to the film in August 2014, late in production, after co-director Don Hall and his crew went to see Marvel Studios' Guardians of the Galaxy. He stated that "[i]t horrified us, that people were sat waiting for an end credits thing, because of the Marvel DNA. We didn't want people to leave the movie disappointed."

Music

Henry Jackman composed the score for the film. The soundtrack features an original song titled "Immortals" written and recorded by American rock band Fall Out Boy, which was released by Walt Disney Records on October 14, 2014. The soundtrack album was digitally released by Walt Disney Records on November 4, 2014, and had a CD release on November 25. While not part of the soundtrack, a brief instrumental section of "Eye of the Tiger" plays in the film. For the Japanese release of the album, a previously unreleased English version of Japanese-American singer Ai's single "Story" was released as a single by EMI Records and Walt Disney Records exclusively in Japan. The song was used in promotional videos and the film's credits for the Japanese release.

Release

Theatrical

Big Hero 6 premiered on October 23, 2014 as the opening film at the Tokyo International Film Festival. The world premiere of Big Hero 6 in 3D took place at the Abu Dhabi Film Festival on October 31, 2014. It was theatrically released in the United States and Canada on November 7, 2014 with limited IMAX international showings. Theatrically, the film was accompanied by the Walt Disney Animation Studios short, Feast.

For the South Korean release of the film, it was retitled Big Hero, to avoid the impression of being a sequel, and edited to remove indications of the characters' Japanese origin. This is owing to the tense relations between Korea and Japan. For instance, the protagonist's name, Hiro Hamada, was changed to "Hero Armada", and Japanese-language signage onscreen was changed to English. Nonetheless, the film caused some online controversy in South Korea, because of small images resembling the Rising Sun Flag in the protagonist's room.

The film was released in China on February 28, 2015.

Home media
Big Hero 6 was released in the United States by Walt Disney Studios Home Entertainment on Blu-ray and DVD on February 24, 2015. Writer Steven T. Seagle, who co-created the comic book Big Hero 6, criticized the Blu-ray featurette documenting the origins of the group, for not mentioning him or co-creator Duncan Rouleau. Seagle also criticized the book Art of Big Hero 6 for the same omission. Big Hero 6 was released in 4K Blu-ray on November 5, 2019.

In the United States, the film grossed  from Blu-ray and DVD sales . In the United Kingdom, it was watched by  viewers on television in 2017, making it the year's second most-watched film on UK television.

Reception

Box office
Big Hero 6 earned $222.5 million in North America and $435.3 million in other territories for a worldwide estimated total of $657.8 million. Calculating in all expenses, Deadline estimated that the film made a profit of $187.34 million. Worldwide, it is the highest-grossing animated film of 2014, and one of the highest-grossing animated films of all time. By grossing over $500 million worldwide, it became the fourth Disney release of 2014 to do so; the other titles being Guardians of the Galaxy, Maleficent, and Captain America: The Winter Soldier.

North America
In the U.S. and Canada, the film is the second-highest-grossing science-fiction animated film (behind 2008's WALL-E), the third-highest-grossing animated superhero comedy film (behind 2004's The Incredibles and 2018's Incredibles 2), and the fifth-highest-grossing Disney animated film. The film earned $1.4 million from late Thursday night showings, which is higher than the previews earned by Frozen ($1.2 million) and The Lego Movie ($400,000). In its opening day on November 7, the film earned $15.8 million, debuting at number two behind Interstellar ($16.9 million). Big Hero 6 topped the box office in its opening weekend, earning $56.2 million from 3,761 theaters ahead of Interstellar ($47.5 million); at the time it was Walt Disney Animation Studios' second-best opening behind Frozen ($67.4 million), both adjusted and unadjusted.

On February 15, 2015, Big Hero 6 became the third-highest-grossing Disney animated film in both the U.S. and Canada, behind The Lion King and Frozen.

Outside North America
Two weeks ahead of its North American release, Big Hero 6 was released in Russia (earned $4.8 million) and Ukraine (earned $0.2 million) in two days (October 25–26). The main reason behind the early release was in order to take advantage of the two weeks of school holidays in Russia. Jeff Bock, box office analyst for Exhibitor Relations, said "For a two-day gross, that's huge. It's a giant number in Russia." In its second weekend, the film added $4.8 million (up 1%) bringing its total nine-day cumulative audience to $10.3 million in Russia and $10.9 including its revenue from Ukraine.

In its opening weekend, the film earned $7.6 million from seventeen markets for a first weekend worldwide total of $79.2 million, behind Interstellar ($132.2 million). It went to number one in the Philippines, Vietnam, and Indonesia. It opened with $4.8 million in Mexico. In Japan, where the film is locally known as Baymax, it opened at second place behind Yo-Kai Watch: Tanjō no Himitsu da Nyan!, with $5.3 million, marking it the second-biggest Disney opening in Japan behind Frozen. and topped the box office for six consecutive weekends. The film opened in second place with $6 million ($6.8 million including previews) in the U.K., which is 15% lower than Frozen. It opened at No. 1 with $14.8 million in China, which is the biggest opening for a Disney and Pixar animated film (breaking Frozen record) and topped the box office for three consecutive weekends.

The film became the highest-grossing Disney animated film in Vietnam and in China (surpassed by Zootopia)), the second-highest-grossing Disney animated film of all time in Russia, in the Philippines (behind Toy Story 3), and in Japan (behind Frozen). In addition to being the second-highest-grossing Disney animated film, it is also the fifth-highest-grossing animated film of all time in China. In total earnings, its biggest markets outside of the United States and Canada are China ($83.5 million) and Japan ($76 million).

Critical response

The site's consensus states: "Agreeably entertaining and brilliantly animated, Big Hero 6 is briskly-paced, action-packed, and often touching." Metacritic, which assigns a normalized rating out of 100 from top reviews from mainstream critics, has calculated a score of 74 based on 38 reviews, indicating "generally favorable reviews". Audiences polled by CinemaScore gave the film an average grade of "A" on an A+ to F scale.

Michael O'Sullivan of The Washington Post gave the film 3.5/4 stars, writing that "The real appeal of Big Hero 6 isn't its action. It's the central character's heart." Maricar Estrella of Fort Worth Star-Telegram gave the film 5 stars, saying it "offers something for everyone: action, camaraderie, superheroes and villains. But mostly, Baymax offers a compassionate and healing voice for those suffering, and a hug that can be felt through the screen." Peter Travers of Rolling Stone gave the film 3 out of 4 stars, stating, "The breakthrough star of the season is here. His name is Baymax and he's impossible not to love. The 3-D animated Big Hero 6 would be a ton less fun without this irresistible blob of roly-poly, robot charisma." Kofi Outlaw of Screen Rant gave the film 4 out of 5 stars or "excellent", explaining that "Big Hero 6 combines Disney wonder and charm with Marvel awe and action to deliver a film that exhibits the best of both studios." Alonso Duralde of The Wrap gave the film a positive review, calling it "sweet and sharp and exciting and hilarious" and says that the film "comes to the rescue of what's become a dreaded movie trope—the origin story—and launches the superhero tale to pleasurable new heights." Calvin Wilson of St. Louis Post-Dispatch gave the film 3.5 of 4 stars, writing that "the storytelling is solid, propelled by characters that you come to care about. And that should make Big Hero 6 a big hit."

Bill Goodykoontz of The Arizona Republic gave the film a positive review, writing, "Directors Don Hall and Chris Williams have made a terrific movie about a boy (Ryan Potter) and his robot friend, who seek answers to a deadly tragedy," calling it an "unexpectedly good treat". Soren Anderson of The Seattle Times gave the film 3.5 out of 4 stars, saying that "Clever, colorful, fast on its feet, frequently very funny and sweet (but not excessively so), Big Hero 6 mixes its myriad influences into a final product that, while in no way original, is immensely entertaining." Michael Rechtshaffen of The Hollywood Reporter gave the film a positive review, saying that "the funny and heartwarming story about the bond between a teen tech geek and a gentle robot represents another can't-miss proposition by Walt Disney Animation Studios." Jon Niccum of The Kansas City Star gave the film 3.5 out of four stars, writing that while it "may hit a few familiar beats inherent to any superhero 'origin story,'" it is still "the best animated film of the year, supplying The Incredibles-size adventure with a level of emotional bonding not seen since The Iron Giant", and that it "never runs low on battery power". Elizabeth Weitzman of the Daily News gave the film 4 out of 5 stars, calling it a "charming animated adventure", saying that with "appealing 3D animation" and a smart and "sharp story and script", it is "one of the rare family films that can fairly boast of having it all: humor, heart and huggability". Rafer Guzmán from Newsday gave the film 3 out of 4 stars, saying that "Marvel plus Disney plus John Lasseter equals an enjoyable jumble of kid-approved action", with "rich, vivid colors and filled with clever details".

Accolades

Future

Possible sequel
On February 18, 2015, the film's directors, Don Hall and Chris Williams, said a sequel was possible. Hall added, "Having said that, of course, we love these characters, and the thought of working with them again some day definitely has its appeal." In March 2015, Genesis Rodriguez told MTV that a sequel was being considered, saying, "…There's nothing definitive. There's talks of something happening. We just don't know what yet." In April 2015, Stan Lee mentioned a projected sequel as one of several that he understood were in Marvel's plans for upcoming films. In March 2021, head animator Zach Parrish expressed a desire for a sequel, "There have definitely been stories told beyond... I think there's still a lot of potential. There's still plenty of time. The beauty of animation is that can pick up the story at the very end of Big Hero, or we could jump in time. We could go wherever we want, since it's animation."

Disney Channel/Disney XD follow-up series

In March 2016, Disney announced that a Big Hero 6 television series was in development and premiered on Disney Channel and Disney XD in 2017. The series takes place immediately after the events of the film, is created and executive produced by Kim Possibles Mark McCorkle and Bob Schooley, and is co-executive produced by Nick Filippi. The majority of the cast from the film returned to voice the characters, except for Wayans Jr. and Miller.

Disney+ spin-off

In December 2020, Disney announced a new Disney+ series titled Baymax!, which would follow Baymax working as a nurse around San Fransokyo. The series premiered on June 29, 2022.

Other media

Comics
 A Japanese manga adaptation of Big Hero 6 (which is titled  in Japan), illustrated by Haruki Ueno, began serialization in Kodansha's Magazine Special from August 20, 2014. A prologue chapter was published in Weekly Shōnen Magazine on August 6, 2014. According to the film's official Japanese website, the manga revealed plot details in Japan before anywhere else in the world. The website also quoted the film's co-director Don Hall, to whom it referred as a manga fan, as saying that the film was Japanese-inspired. Yen Press published the series in English.
 It was announced that IDW Publishing will be adapting the Disney version of Big Hero 6 into an ongoing comic. This marks one of the few times where Marvel Comics loans out one of its properties to another comic publishing company. The series was intended to debut in July 2018 with Hannah Blumenreich writing and Nicoletta Baldari doing the art. The release of the first issue was later pushed to September 19, 2018, before getting pushed back to April 2019 and now titled after the television series.
 A manhwa adaptation of several episodes of Big Hero 6: The Series was released in August 2021. Published by Yen Press, the series is written by JuYoun Lee and illustrated by Hong Gyun An.

Video games
A video game based on the film titled Big Hero 6: Battle in the Bay was released on October 28, 2014 for the Nintendo 3DS and Nintendo DS. This game is set after the events of the film and is a side-scrolling beat 'em up game.  Four of the six members are playable (with Baymax and Honey Lemon being non-playable), and the Touch Screen can be used to launch Honey Lemon's grenades in the heat of battle. This was the last game released for the original Nintendo DS. Additionally, after the game's release a Disney Two Pack was released containing both this game and Disney Frozen: Olaf's Quest on one cartridge.
Hiro and Baymax from the film are also available in Disney Infinity 2.0 as playable Disney Originals characters in the Toy Box. As with the other playable characters in the games, tie-in figures for them were also released.
A mobile game based on the film titled Big Hero 6: Bot Fight was also released on November 3, 2014. It takes place a year after the events of the film, where the heroes discover and battle runaway robots via match-3 battles. It was later discontinued on February 3, 2016 due to the constraints of Disney Mobile's support team and the need to discontinue old games to release new ones.  
The six members of Big Hero 6 and Yokai appear as playable characters, along with other material based on the film, in the world builder video game Disney Magic Kingdoms. In the game, the characters are involved in new storylines that serve as a continuation of the events of the film.
A world based on Big Hero 6  makes its debut appearance in Kingdom Hearts III. The world continues the story from the events at the end of the film, with Organization XIII taking control of Baymax's original body that was left behind in the portal space, turning it into a monstrous Heartless that Baymax and Sora fight. The cast of the film reprise their roles as the members of Big Hero 6, with the exception of Wayans.

Toys
Vinyl toy company Funko released the first images of the toy figures via their Big Hero 6 Funko. The POP Vinyl series collection features Hiro Hamada, Go Go Tomago, Wasabi, Honey Lemon, Fred, and a 6-inch Baymax.

Bandai released a number of action figures related to the film; these toys including a number of different Baymax figures. One is a soft plastic 10-inch version that includes a series of projected stills from the film on his stomach, which can be changed when the figure's arm is moved, and which emits accompanying sounds. Deluxe Flying Baymax, which retails for $39.99, depicts the armored version of the character and features lights and sounds that activate at the push of a button. Placing the Hiro figurine on his back changes the sounds into speech and when the figure is tilted, the sounds are those of flying. The Armor-Up Baymax (original retail cost $19.99) comes with 20 pieces of armor that can be assembled onto the robot by the owner. The other characters from the film, including the other members of team and Professor Callaghan (who is called Yokai) are issued in 4-inch action figures, each of which have eight points of articulation.

References

External links

Big Hero 6 at Walt Disney Animation Studios

2014 action comedy films
2010s American animated films
2010s animated superhero films
2010s science fiction comedy films
2014 3D films
2014 computer-animated films
2014 films
American action comedy films
American animated science fiction films
American science fiction comedy films
American teen comedy films
American animated comedy films
Animated films about orphans
Animated coming-of-age films
Animated films about brothers
Animated films about friendship
Animated films based on Marvel Comics
Animated teen superhero comedy films
American animated feature films
Anime-influenced Western animation
Annie Award winners
Bandai brands
Yen Press titles
Best Animated Feature Academy Award winners
Film
2010s English-language films
Film superheroes
Films about technology
Films adapted into television shows
Films directed by Chris Williams
Films directed by Don Hall
Films scored by Henry Jackman
Animated films set in San Francisco
Animated films set in Tokyo
IMAX films
Science fantasy films
Teleportation in films
Walt Disney Animation Studios films
Films about wormholes
3D animated films
2014 science fiction action films
American children's animated superhero films
Cultural depictions of Stan Lee
Cyberpunk films
Walt Disney Pictures animated films